Filippa Duci or Filippa Ducci (1520, Moncalieri, Piedmont – before October 1586, near Tours), dame de Couy, was a French (originally Italian) courtesan. She was the mother of Diane de France.

Life
Her father was Gian Antonio Duci. During the Italian Wars in 1537, the French dauphin Henry (later Henry II of France) stayed with a squire, Filippa's brother, Gian Antonio Duci.  Henry was seduced by Filippa on first sight, and she became his mistress. When Henri heard Duci was pregnant, he arranged for her to be maintained until she gave birth.  Duci gave birth to their daughter, Diane de France, in Paris in 1538. This proved that Henry was not sterile; he had been married to Catherine de Médici, yet had still not produced an heir due to urological problems. The baby was named Diane after Henry's love, his mistress Diane de Poitiers, who raised the child along with her own two children.

In 1541, Francis I of France granted Duci 400  a year for life in an Ordinaire de Touraine and allowed her to retire to a convent. She married the Italian gentleman and privy councillor Jean Bernardin de Saint-Severin in 1546. After Diane was legitimized, Filippa was known as dame de Bléré en Touraine. In 1582, she became a lady in waiting to queen dowager Catherine de Médici.

References

Bibliography
 
 
 
 
 

1520 births
16th-century deaths
16th-century Italian women
Mistresses of Henry II of France
French ladies-in-waiting
Household of Catherine de' Medici